Richard Douglas Poll (April 23, 1918 – April 27, 1994) was an American historian, academic, author and member of the Church of Jesus Christ of Latter-day Saints (LDS Church).  His liberal religiosity influenced his notable metaphor about "Iron Rod" vs. "Liahona" LDS Church members.

Biography
Poll was born in Salt Lake City, where he lived until moving to Fort Worth, Texas at age 10.  He published his first article at age 13 in Liahona, the Elders' Journal, a missionary magazine published by the LDS Church.  From 1939-1941 he served as an LDS missionary, first in Germany until World War II began, and then in Canada.  From 1942-1945, Poll served as a first lieutenant in the U.S. Army Air Force without seeing the front.  He married Emogene (Gene) Hill in 1943 in the Salt Lake Temple, and they remained married until their deaths in 1994 in Provo, Utah.

Throughout his life, Poll was active in the LDS Church and served in various positions, such as stake high councilor.

Academics
In Fort Worth, Poll studied at Texas Christian University (TCU), completing a bachelor's degree in history in 1938.  He also received a master's degree from TCU in 1939, writing his thesis on the U.S. campaign against Mormon polygamy.  Poll later received a Ph.D. in history from the University of California, Berkeley in 1948.

From 1948-1970 Poll was a history professor at Brigham Young University (BYU).  In 1955, he became chair of the department of history.  He was the charter president of the American Association of University Professors (AAUP) at BYU in 1959.  In 1962, Poll became associate director of the BYU Honors Program, and was named Honors Professor of the Year at BYU in 1969.  From 1958-65, he had also occasionally taught at the University of Maryland, College Park, European Division.  At BYU, Poll clashed with BYU administration and some church leadership over his AAUP involvement, their anti-communism, and the role of organic evolution.  After uncertainty over whether his BYU contract would be renewed, Poll resigned to take a position as vice president of Western Illinois University (WIU) in 1969.  He remained in that role until 1975, though he continued teaching history at WIU until 1983.  In his retirement, Poll taught occasional classes at BYU from 1983 until his death in 1994.

From 1978-1993, Poll and his wife taught reading and writing skills in adult education classes offered by the LDS Church.

"Iron Rod" and "Liahona" metaphor
Poll wrote on various topics in Latter-day Saint history and thought.  His religious approach was influenced by his studies at TCU, where he examined and rejected creationism, scriptural literalism, and prophetic infallibility.  He remembered one professor saying "the purpose of religion is to comfort the afflicted and afflict the comfortable."  In 1963, Poll prepared a paper called "What the Church Means to People Like Me", which he delivered in the Palo Alto Ward sacrament meeting in August 1967 and published in Dialogue: A Journal of Mormon Thought.

The paper drew upon Book of Mormon imagery.  In Lehi and Nephi's vision, people held onto an "iron rod" that followed a single path to salvation.  In another story, a mysterious instrument, called the "Liahona", pointed righteous travelers toward their destination.  Poll's paper set up a dichotomy between church members who see the gospel as clear and exact, or "hold to the Iron Rod", and those who follow the guidance of the church as a compass to lead their lives.  He explained:

The Iron Rod Saint does not look for questions but for answers, and in the gospel he finds or is confident that he can find the answer to every important question. The Liahona Saint, on the other hand, is preoccupied with questions and skeptical of answers; he finds in the gospel answers to enough important questions so that he can function purposefully without answers to the rest.

The subject caught the attention of LDS intellectuals and leaders, becoming a poignant metaphor in cultural discourse.  It would become Poll's best known article, and was republished several other times.

In a 1971 General Conference address, church apostle Harold B. Lee alluded to and denounced Poll's ideas, saying:

If there is any one thing most needed in this time of tumult and frustration, ... it is an "iron rod" as a safe guide along the straight path on the way to eternal life, ... There are many who profess to be religious and speak of themselves as Christians, and, according to one such, "as accepting the scriptures only as sources of inspiration and moral truth," and then ask in their smugness: "Do the revelations of God give us a handrail to the kingdom of God, as the Lord's messenger told Lehi, or merely a compass?"... Wouldn't it be a great thing if all who are well schooled in secular learning could hold fast to the "iron rod," or the word of God, ... ?

Lee also quoted the phrase, "A liberal in the Church is merely one who does not have a testimony." Lee then quoted John A. Widtsoe's definition of "a liberal in the church" as one who has broken with the fundamental principles, does not believe in its basic concepts, and sets out to reform it by changing its foundations. Lee's reference broke with the context of Widtsoe's talk, however, which was not a rhetorical attack on liberals, but rather the misuse of the term liberal to mean those who reject religious faith due to a perceived unwillingness within the religious community to embrace change and progress. In the Widtsoe talk, which Lee had quoted out of context, Widtsoe had said:

The word liberal, correctly used, has a noble meaning. The true liberal… is tolerant, free from bigotry, and generous in all his deeds. He places truth above all else and hungers for full truth. He welcomes all new improvements and calls for more… He insists that every new invention must be used for human welfare, with full respect to civil and moral law. In short, the liberal seeks to make better the day in which he lives, and he becomes therefore a crusader for the betterment of the human race… His liberalism lies in his constant attempt to make the underlying unchanging principles of the cause he represents serve the changing conditions of the day. He may differ with the superficial conventions of the past, but not with its established truths. He may refuse to continue the church architecture of the past, but will insist that the ancient truths of the Gospel be taught... forever seeking, under changing conditions, to make the doctrine of human brotherhood more effective in behalf of the needy... the Church of Jesus Christ of Latter-day Saints is pre-eminently liberal… It declares that men "live and move and have their being" under the law of progress. Change steps upon the heels of change in the unfolding of a progressive universe. The simple eternal truths of existence are combined and combined again, in different ways, but progressively, to serve man on his never-ending journey… Members of the Church of Jesus Christ of Latter-day Saints do not need to look elsewhere for a liberal Church.

Poll and his wife considered themselves "Liahona" Mormons.

Honors
1939 Wilber Kidd Fellowship at Texas Christian University
1948 Willard D. Thompson Fellowship at University of California, Berkeley
1969 BYU Honors Professor of the Year
1970 President of the Mormon History Association.
1979 Presidential Merit Award for quality and accuracy in historical work
1985 Secretary/Treasurer of the BYU Academy Foundation
1994 Personal Essay award from the Association for Mormon Letters for "A Liahona Latter-day Saint"

Writings

Books

Articles

Other

References

External links 
 The Richard Douglas Poll Papers at the University of Utah's Marriott Library
 

1918 births
1994 deaths
20th-century Mormon missionaries
American Latter Day Saint writers
United States Army Air Forces personnel of World War II
American Mormon missionaries in Germany
Brigham Young University faculty
Historians of the Latter Day Saint movement
Historians of Utah
American Mormon missionaries in Canada
People from Fort Worth, Texas
Writers from Salt Lake City
Texas Christian University alumni
University of California, Berkeley alumni
University of Maryland, College Park faculty
Western Illinois University faculty
20th-century American historians
20th-century American male writers
20th-century American biographers
Latter Day Saints from California
Latter Day Saints from Illinois
Latter Day Saints from Maryland
Latter Day Saints from Texas
Latter Day Saints from Utah
United States Army Air Forces officers
American male non-fiction writers